Akhada Balapur

Demography
As per 2011 census, Balapur has total 2506 families residing. Village has population of 12,505 of which 6,495 were males while 6,010 were females.
Average Sex Ratio of Balapur village is 925 which is lesser than Maharashtra state average of 929.
Literacy rate of Balapur village was 82.34% compared to 82.95% of Maharashtra. Male literacy rate was 89.67% while female literacy rate was 75.08%.
Schedule Caste (SC) constitutes 18.28% while Schedule Tribe (ST) were 7.22% of total population.

References

Cities and towns in Hingoli district